Greg Kennedy (born 28 July 1949) is a former Australian rules footballer who played in the early 1970s with VFL club Carlton.

Kennedy was recruited from Eaglehawk in the Bendigo Football League and made his VFL debut with Carlton in round 1, 1972, at the age of 22. Playing at full forward or on a half-forward flank, Kennedy ended his first year as Carlton's leading goalkicker with a tally of 79—including a near-club record of 12.3 in round 21 against Hawthorn—winning the club's Best First Year Player award. The following season, Kennedy suffered a back injury which affected his performance, and he managed only 30 goals, the same injury keeping him on the sidelines for the entirety of the 1974 season. He returned to play in 1975 but failed to recapture his best form and was delisted the same year, having kicked 143 goals for the Blues in 48 games, an average of just under 3 goals per game.

References
 Greg Kennedy at Blueseum

1949 births
Carlton Football Club players
Eaglehawk Football Club players
Australian rules footballers from Victoria (Australia)
Living people